The Beautiful Corsair (Italian: La bella corsara) is a 1928 Italian silent film directed by Wladimiro De Liguoro and starring Rina De Liguoro, Bruto Castellani and Carlos Montes.

Cast
 Rina De Liguoro as La bella corsara  
 Carlos Montes as Il corsaro della nave nemica
 Bruto Castellani as L'altro corsaro

References

Bibliography 
 Monaco, James. Film Actors Guide. Scarecrow Press, 1977.

External links 
 

1928 films
Italian silent feature films
1920s Italian-language films
Films directed by Wladimiro De Liguoro
Italian black-and-white films
Pirate films
Silent adventure films